Georgics Hatziioannidis (born 1951 in the Soviet Union) is a Greek wrestler. He was Olympic bronze medalist in Freestyle wrestling in 1980, and also competed at the 1972 and 1976 Olympics.

References

External links

1951 births
Living people
Soviet people of Greek descent
Olympic wrestlers of Greece
Wrestlers at the 1972 Summer Olympics
Wrestlers at the 1976 Summer Olympics
Wrestlers at the 1980 Summer Olympics
Greek male sport wrestlers
Olympic bronze medalists for Greece
Olympic medalists in wrestling
Medalists at the 1980 Summer Olympics
20th-century Greek people